Mekeil Andy Williams (born 24 July 1990) is a Trinidadian professional footballer who plays as a full-back for Chattanooga Red Wolves in the USL League One.

Club career
Born in Port of Spain, Williams spent his early career with Ma Pau and W Connection. In February 2012 he joined Polish club Pogoń Szczecin on a five-month loan deal. He moved to Danish club FC Fyn in August 2012 on a free transfer. After returning to Trinidad to play with W Connection, he signed a two-year contract with Guatemalan club Antigua GFC in June 2015.

Williams signed for Major League Soccer side Colorado Rapids on 4 February 2016.

Williams signed for USL side Richmond Kickers for the 2018 season on 16 February 2018.

He signed for Oklahoma City Energy for the 2019 season.

Williams moved to Liga Nacional de Fútbol de Guatemala side Municipal on 30 December 2019.

On 10 March 2021, Williams signed a one-year deal with USL Championship side Pittsburgh Riverhounds.

Williams joined USL League One side Chattanooga Red Wolves on 2 March 2023.

International career

He made his senior international debut for Trinidad and Tobago in 2012, scoring on his debut.

References

1990 births
Living people
Trinidad and Tobago footballers
Trinidad and Tobago international footballers
Ma Pau Stars S.C. players
W Connection F.C. players
Pogoń Szczecin players
FC Fyn players
Antigua GFC players
Colorado Rapids players
Richmond Kickers players
TT Pro League players
Major League Soccer players
USL Championship players
Association football defenders
Trinidad and Tobago expatriate footballers
2015 CONCACAF Gold Cup players
OKC Energy FC players
2019 CONCACAF Gold Cup players
2021 CONCACAF Gold Cup players
Trinidad and Tobago expatriate sportspeople in Poland
Expatriate footballers in Poland
Trinidad and Tobago expatriate sportspeople in Denmark
Expatriate men's footballers in Denmark
Trinidad and Tobago expatriate sportspeople in Guatemala
Expatriate footballers in Guatemala
Trinidad and Tobago expatriate sportspeople in the United States
Expatriate soccer players in the United States
Liga Nacional de Fútbol de Guatemala players
Pittsburgh Riverhounds SC players
Chattanooga Red Wolves SC players